Glyphostoma kihikihi is a species of sea snail, a marine gastropod mollusk in the family Clathurellidae.

Description

Distribution
This species occurs in the Pacific Ocean along Hawaii.

References

kihikihi
Gastropods described in 1979